The Communist Party of the Soviet Union (Kommunisticheskaya Partiya Sovetskogo Soyuza; short: КПСС, KPSS) is a political party led by Sergei Skvortsov operating in the countries of the former Soviet Union. The party was founded in 1992 at the so-called 29th Congress of the Communist Party of the Soviet Union, which among other actions excluded former President Mikhail Gorbachev from the newly formed party. It claims to be the inheritors of the legacy of the original Soviet Communist Party and among its goals states the restoration of the Soviet Union. The party has launched several front groups, such as the All-Russian Committee for Defence of Kuriles, the Movement for Social Justice and the Inter-Regional Strike Committee. The central publication of the party is Narodnaya Gazeta (People's Newspaper). Skvortsov operates as the First Secretary of the Central Committee of the Communist Party of the Soviet Union as well as the editor-in-chief of the publication.

External links

   

Anti-revisionist organizations
Communist parties in Russia
Far-left politics in Russia
Neo-Sovietism
Political parties established in 1992
Transnational political parties